The Diocese of Salina is a Latin Church ecclesiastical territory or diocese of the Catholic Church covering thirty-one counties in Kansas. The counties included in this diocese are Cheyenne, Sherman, Wallace, Logan, Thomas, Rawlins, Decatur, Sheridan, Gove, Trego, Graham, Norton, Phillips, Rooks, Ellis, Russell, Osborne, Smith, Jewel, Mitchell, Lincoln, Ellsworth, Saline, Ottawa, Cloud, Republic, Washington, Clay, Dickinson, Geary, and Riley.  It covers 26,685 square miles and has a Catholic population of 40,546. The episcopal see is in Salina, Kansas. It was founded as the Diocese of Concordia on August 2, 1887, and on December 23, 1944, was renamed Diocese of Salina. The Diocese of Salina is a suffragan diocese in the ecclesiastical province of the metropolitan Archdiocese of Kansas City in Kansas.

On Wednesday, June 13, 2018, Pope Francis named Gerald Lee Vincke, a priest of the Diocese of Lansing (based in Lansing, Michigan), who until then had been the parish priest (pastor) of the Holy Family Parish, in Grand Blanc, Michigan, as the Bishop of the Diocese of Salina, to succeed Edward Weisenburger. He was installed as bishop on August 22, 2018.

Bishops

Bishops of Concordia
 Richard Scannell (1887–1891), appointed Bishop of Omaha
 Thaddeus J. Butler (1897) (died before consecration)
 John F. Cunningham (1898–1919) 
 Francis Joseph Tief (1920–1938)

Bishops of Salina
 Francis Augustine Thill (1938–1957) (see change was in 1944)
 Frederick William Freking (1957–1964), appointed Bishop of La Crosse
 Cyril John Vogel (1965–1979)
 Daniel Kucera, OSB (1980–1983), appointed Archbishop of Dubuque
 George Kinzie Fitzsimons (1984–2004)
 Paul Stagg Coakley (2004–2010), appointed Archbishop of Oklahoma City
 Edward Joseph Weisenburger (2012–2017), appointed Bishop of Tucson
 Gerald Lee Vincke (2018–present)

High schools
Sacred Heart High School, Salina
St. John's Catholic High School, Beloit
St. Xavier High School, Junction City
Thomas More Prep-Marian, Hays
Tipton Catholic High School, Tipton

Sex abuse investigation
In February 2019, it was announced that the Kansas Bureau of Investigation (KBI) had been investigating sex abuse allegations against all Catholic diocese in the state of Kansas, which includes the Diocese of Salina, since November 2018. On August 14, 2020, Melissa Underwood, spokeswoman for the KBI, stated in an email “As of Aug. 7, we have had 205 reports of abuse and have opened 120 cases.”

Ecclesiastical province
See: List of the Catholic bishops of the United States#Province of Kansas City

See also
 Catholic Church by country
 Catholic Church hierarchy
 List of the Catholic dioceses of the United States

References

External links
Diocese of Salina Official Site

 
Roman Catholic Ecclesiastical Province of Kansas City
Salina, Kansas
Salina
Salina
Salina
1887 establishments in Kansas